Tazeh Kand (also Romanized as Tāzeh Kand; also known as Tāzeh Kand-e Arshaq) is a village in Arshaq-e Gharbi Rural District, Moradlu District, Meshgin Shahr County, Ardabil Province, Iran. At the 2006 census, its population was 349, in 87 families.

References 

Towns and villages in Meshgin Shahr County